The 2010 Silverstone Superleague Formula round was a Superleague Formula round, held on 4 April 2010 at the Silverstone Circuit, Northamptonshire, England. It was the first ever round at the Silverstone Circuit and the opening round of the 2010 Superleague Formula season.

It was the first Superleague Formula round in the United Kingdom which is not hosted at Donington Park. Donington Park hosted 2008 and 2009 events. Brands Hatch will also host a round of the Superleague Formula series later in the season.

British teams competing have been confirmed with the participation of reigning champions Liverpool F.C. and runners up Tottenham Hotspur. FC Midtjylland and Rangers F.C. did not continue in the series in 2010, but new team GD Bordeaux were ready in time to make their debut at this event.

Support races included the Dutch Supercar Challenge, the SPEED Series and the World Sportscar and Grand Prix Masters.

Report

Practice and qualifying
Three practice sessions were held before the race; all were held on Friday and all were 30 minutes in duration. Tottenham Hotspur (Craig Dolby) finished on top of the rain affected session one with a time of 1:46.585. Session two had much better weather, with A.S. Roma (Julien Jousse) leading the timesheets with a 1:36.819. Session three was a rainout with no times being recorded. SC Corinthians (Robert Doornbos) and A.S. Roma (Julien Jousse) were some of the drivers to test the conditions, but both teams ended up in the gravel. Session three was ultimately red flagged.

The qualifying session was firstly split into two groups after practice on Friday; Group A and Group B. Teams compete against each other teams in their own groups, with the top four in each group advancing to the 'knock out stages'.

In Group A's 15 minute qualifying session on Saturday, F.C. Porto (Álvaro Parente) finished first with a time of 1:34.520. Also advancing were the two 'home teams' of Tottenham Hotspur and Liverpool F.C. and Swiss team FC Basel.

In Group Bs 15 minute qualifying session, Olympique Lyonnais (Sébastien Bourdais) finished first with a time of 1:34.432. Also advancing were Sevilla FC, CR Flamengo and A.C. Milan.
Towards the end of Group B running, the rain started to come down again. This affected times at the end of the session with multiple cars going off the track. R.S.C. Anderlecht (Davide Rigon) ended their qualifying session in the gravel trap, complaining of new accelerator problems.

Race 1

Race 2

Super Final

Results

Qualifying
 In each group, the top four qualify for the quarter-finals.

Group A

Group B

Knockout stages

Grid

Race 1

Race 2

Super Final

Standings after the round

References

External links
 Official results from the Superleague Formula website

Silverstone
Superleague Formula Silverstone